Earina aestivalis is a species of orchid that is endemic to the North Island of New Zealand. The specific epithet, aestivalis, is derived from Latin and means "pertaining to the summer".

References

External links 
 Picture and description

Endemic orchids of New Zealand
aestivalis
Taxa named by Thomas Frederic Cheeseman